The men's 4 × 100 metres relay event at the 2019 African Games was held on 27 and 28 August in Rabat.

Medalists

*Athletes who competed in heats only

Results

Heats
Qualification: First 3 teams of each heat (Q) plus the next 2 fastest (q) qualified for the final.

Final

References

Relay
African Games